Dumitru Ciubașenco (born 14 August 1963) is a journalist from the Republic of Moldova.

Biography 
He was the head of Moldavschie Vedomosti and worked for Radio Free Europe. He was a candidate of the Liberal Democratic Party of Moldova for July 2009 Moldovan parliamentary election and now is the spokesman of Valeriu Pasat, the Chairman of the Humanist Party (Moldova) and the former Moldovan Minister of Defense and ex-director of the Moldovan intelligence.

Awards 
 Order of the Republic (Moldova) – highest state distinctions (2009)

References

External links 
 Ciubașenco Dumitru

1963 births
Living people
Moldovan journalists
Male journalists
Moscow State University alumni
Writers from Chișinău
Radio Free Europe/Radio Liberty people
Recipients of the Order of the Republic (Moldova)